McPherson County is a county in the U.S. state of South Dakota. As of the 2020 census, the population was 2,411. Its county seat is Leola.

History
The county was created in 1873 and organized in 1884. It is named for American Civil War General James B. McPherson.

Geography
McPherson County lies on the north line of South Dakota. The north boundary line of McPherson County abuts the south boundary line of the state of North Dakota. Its terrain consists of rolling hills, largely devoted to agriculture, and dotted with small lakes and ponds. The terrain generally slopes to the south and east.

The Samuel H. Ordway Jr., Memorial Prairie, a  grassland owned by The Nature Conservancy on the south side of South Dakota Highway 10 about 10 miles (16 km) west of Leola, is home to a bison herd.

Major highways

 South Dakota Highway 10
 South Dakota Highway 45
 South Dakota Highway 47
 South Dakota Highway 247
 South Dakota Highway 239

Adjacent counties

 McIntosh County, North Dakota - north
 Dickey County, North Dakota - northeast
 Brown County - east
 Edmunds County - south
 Walworth County - southwest
 Campbell County - west

Protected areas

 Elm Lake State Game Production Area
 Moscow State Game Production Area
 Morlock State Game Production Area
 North Jackson State Game Production Area
 Odessa State Game Production Area
 Pfeiffle-Neuharth State Game Production Area
 Rath State Game Production Area
 Rosenthal State Game Production Area
 Schock State Game Production Area
 Schumacher State Game Production Area
 Simpson State Game Production Area
 School State Game Production Area
 South Jackson State Game Production Area
 Stout State Game Production Area
 Wageman State Game Production Area
 Wolff State Game Production Area

Lakes

 Crompton Lake
 Elm Lake (partial)
 Eureka Lake
 Feinstein Lake
 Hausauer Lake
 Heufel Lake
 Klooz Lake
 Long Lake

Demographics

2000 census
As of the 2000 United States Census, there were 2,904 people, 1,227 households, and 822 families in the county. The population density was 3 people per square mile (1/km2). There were 1,465 housing units at an average density of 1.3 per square mile (0.5/km2). The racial makeup of the county was 99.35% White, 0.28% Native American, 0.14% Asian, 0.03% from other races, and 0.21% from two or more races. 0.21% of the population were Hispanic or Latino of any race.

There were 1,227 households, out of which 23.60% had children under the age of 18 living with them, 62.10% were married couples living together, 2.70% had a female householder with no husband present, and 33.00% were non-families. 31.10% of all households were made up of individuals, and 19.20% had someone living alone who was 65 years of age or older. The average household size was 2.31 and the average family size was 2.91.

The county population contained 22.20% under the age of 18, 4.50% from 18 to 24, 20.10% from 25 to 44, 23.60% from 45 to 64, and 29.60% who were 65 years of age or older. The median age was 48 years. For every 100 females there were 93.70 males. For every 100 females age 18 and over, there were 91.40 males.

The median income for a household in the county was $22,380, and the median income for a family was $29,811. Males had a median income of $23,705 versus $17,850 for females. The per capita income for the county was $12,748. About 17.00% of families and 22.60% of the population were below the poverty line, including 25.80% of those under age 18 and 22.20% of those age 65 or over.

2010 census
As of the 2010 census, there were 2,459 people, 1,025 households, and 632 families in the county. The racial makeup of the county was 98.2% white, 0.2% Asian, 0.1% Pacific islander, 0.2% from other races, and 1.3% from two or more races. Those of Hispanic or Latino origin made up 1.0% of the population. In terms of ancestry, 74.5% were German, 17.7% were Russian, 7.3% were Norwegian, 6.7% were English, and 2.5% were American.

Of the 1,025 households, 19.5% had children under the age of 18 living with them, 54.1% were married couples living together, 4.3% had a female householder with no husband present, 38.3% were non-families, and 36.3% of all households were made up of individuals. The average household size was 2.06 and the average family size was 2.66. The median age was 50.8 years.

The median income for a household in the county was $31,923 and the median income for a family was $47,500. Males had a median income of $31,953 versus $27,941 for females. The per capita income for the county was $19,255. About 12.5% of families and 16.5% of the population were below the poverty line, including 21.3% of those under age 18 and 27.1% of those age 65 or over.

Communities

Cities
 Eureka
 Leola (county seat)

Towns
 Hillsview
 Long Lake
 Wetonka

Census-designated places 

 Grassland Colony
 Long Lake Colony
 Spring Creek Colony

Unincorporated communities
 Greenway
 Long Lake Colony
 Madra (partial)

Townships

 Carl
 Hoffman
 Wachter
 Wacker
 Weber

Politics
Except during the 1924, 1928 and 1932 elections when anti-Prohibition sentiment by the county's German Lutheran populace turned the county against Calvin Coolidge and Herbert Hoover, McPherson County has been among the most overwhelmingly Republican in the country. Apart from these anomalous elections, the free silver-influenced 1896 election, and the 1936 Democratic landslide in the aftermath of Prohibition, the best performance by any Democrat has been Barack Obama’s 32 percent in 2008. In 1968 and 1980 McPherson was among the five most Republican counties in the country, and in 1964 it was rivalled only by neighbouring Campbell County and the famous Republican bastions of Hooker County, Nebraska and Jackson County, Kentucky as Barry Goldwater’s best county outside the former Confederacy.

See also
 National Register of Historic Places listings in McPherson County, South Dakota

References

 
1884 establishments in Dakota Territory
Populated places established in 1884